Argyroeides nephelophora is a moth of the subfamily Arctiinae. It was described by George Hampson in 1914. It is found in Paraguay.

References

Moths described in 1914
Argyroeides
Moths of South America